The W. H. Silbaugh House, near Jerome, Idaho, is a lava rock structure built in 1920. It was listed on the National Register of Historic Places in 1983.

It is a one-and-one-half-story bungalow-style house on a high foundation.

The house was deemed "significant as an example of its vernacular house style. It is a good example of modest homes built in rural areas in the area ... in the 1910s."

References

Houses on the National Register of Historic Places in Idaho
Houses completed in 1920
Jerome County, Idaho
Lava rock buildings and structures